Rarities 1979–1981 was the digital release by the Southern Californian punk rock band Cardiac Kidz of the vinyl LP released by Rave-Up records in 2009. This album, contains the 14 tracks from the vinyl LP plus unreleased tracks from the 1979 Spirit Night Club show in which the EP "Playground" showcased 4 tracks in the 1979 release. The CD also contains studio recordings that couldn't fit on the vinyl LP record. The Cardiac Kidz showcased their ability to cross music genres by producing music that treads over both punk rock, and new wave. Along with Meet with Me, it was released on December 1, 2010 on Blindspot Records.

Track listing

Personnel

Cardiac Kidz
 Jim Ryan - lead vocals, drums, percussion
 Billy Williams - rhythm guitar, backing vocals
 Bill Lubbers- rhythm guitar, backing vocals
 Joe Foy - bass guitar,
Additional musicians
 Jerry Flack - lead guitar, backing vocals
 Steve Lightfoot - bass guitar,
 David George - lead guitar

Production
 Digital Release produced by Bart Mendoza, Blindspot Records, San Diego, CA
 Mixed by Dr Sound, San Diego, CA
 "Punkett", “Paper Towel”, "Human Emotion" and "Your Making Me Cry" mixed by Jim Ryan at Circle Sound Studio, San Diego, CA
 Live tracks Recorded by Dr Sound, San Diego, CA
 Additional Engineering by Jim Ryan
 Art Direction by Bart Mendoza and Jim Ryan
 Graphic Design: Bart Mendoza and Jim Ryan

2010 albums